Dana H. is a play written by Lucas Hnath. The play, based on the real-life experiences of Hnath's mother Dana Higginbotham, premiered at the Kirk Douglas Theatre in previews on May 26, 2019 and officially on June 2. The production was directed by Les Waters and starred Deirdre O'Connell. The play premiered on Broadway at the Lyceum Theatre in repertory with the Tina Satter play Is This a Room, premiering in previews on October 1, 2021 and officially on October 17. It closed on November 28. The play received three Tony Award nominations, winning for Best Actress in a Play (O'Connell) and Best Sound Design of a Play (Mikhail Fiksel).

References

External links 

 Internet Broadway Database

2019 plays
Broadway plays
Tony Award-winning plays